ABX may refer to:
 ABX test, a double-blind testing method commonly used in codec listening tests and in ascertaining high fidelity
 Abaknon language, an Austronesian language of the Philippines
 Albury Airport in Albury, New South Wales, Australia, from its IATA airport code
 Barrick Gold, from its TSX and NYSE stock symbol
 Antibiotics, antibacterial medications
 ABX Air
 An asset-backed securities index
 ABX diagnostics, a medical device manufacturer, which was acquired by Horiba